Bab's Burglar was a 1917 American silent romantic comedy film directed by J. Searle Dawley and distributed by Paramount Pictures. The film followed Bab's Diary, released on October 17, 1917, and was the second in the trilogy of Babs films that starred Marguerite Clark.

Richard Barthelmess also appeared in an early role in his career.

Plot
As described in a film magazine, Bab's father (Losee) decides to give her an allowance of $1,000 per year with nothing extra. Bab (Clark), believing herself in possession of a small fortune, buys violets for all of her teachers and an automobile for herself, spending the remaining funds for its upkeep. After balancing her books, she finds that she has 16 cents left for the year. However, her father is right there to help her out. She is anxious to see her sister Leila (Greene) married off so that she will be treated as a young woman. Bab mistakes the young man interested in her sister for a burglar and interferes with her sister's elopement. Disgusted at her failure to assist Leila, Bab retires, not knowing that she saved her sister from the hands of a fortune hunter.

Cast
 Marguerite Clark as Bab Archibald
 Leone Morgan as Jane Raleigh
 Richard Barthelmess as Tommy Gray
 Frank Losee as Mr. Archibald
 Isabel O'Madigan as Mrs. Archibald
 Helen Greene as Leila Archibald
 Nigel Barrie as Carter Brooks
 Guy Coombs as Harry
 George Odell as The Butler
 William Hinckley 
 Daisy Belmore

Preservation status
All three Bab's films are now presumed to be lost.

See also
 List of lost films
 Bab's Diary
 Bab's Matinee Idol

References

External links

 
 

1917 films
1917 romantic comedy films
American romantic comedy films
American silent feature films
American black-and-white films
Films directed by J. Searle Dawley
Films based on works by Mary Roberts Rinehart
American sequel films
Lost American films
Paramount Pictures films
1917 lost films
Lost romantic comedy films
1910s American films
Silent romantic comedy films
Silent American comedy films
1910s English-language films
English-language romantic comedy films